Láhpoluoppal is a village in Kautokeino Municipality in Troms og Finnmark county, Norway.  The village is located at the southern end of the large lake Láhpojávri, along the Norwegian National Road 92.  The small village lies on the vast Finnmarksvidda plateau, about half-way between the villages of Masi and Kautokeino.  The Láhpoluoppal Chapel is located in the village.

References

Villages in Finnmark
Kautokeino
Populated places of Arctic Norway